Mercia Deane-Johns is an Australian actress of film, stage and television. She is also a writer, singer, and stand-up comedienne. She has played a wide array of characters since she was 12 years old and has appeared in many film roles and TV series on Australian screens.

Education
Born in Melbourne on 21 February 1958, Mercia Deane-Johns trained at a Television and Film Course at Crawford Productions, 1974. She plays Classical Piano at Sixth Grade Level and she has studied ballet at the Gertrud Bodenwieser Dance Centre, Sydney.  Deane-Johns has a diploma of classical singing and theory of music from the London College of Music, Ealing, London.  She is an Associate of the London College of Music (A.L.C.M) which qualification she obtained in 1975.

She was on a twelve-month contract at the Melbourne Theatre Company in 1978.

She has studied Tai Chi and had private lessons with the late Tennyson Yui for one year, 1980.

Deane-Johns attended Southern Cross University during 2006–2010 and obtained a Bachelor of Arts in writing and communication.

Career

Film and television
Deane-Johns was in the Australian TV series Homicide in 1975 and 1976 as Brenda Lukins. She performed in the Crawford Productions TV series Bluey as 'Debbie Morley' in 1976. In 1977, she was in Cop Shop a long running Crawford Productions police drama series. She had a small role in the 1978 Australian TV movie Demolition which starred John Waters and veteran Oz actor Vincent Ball. Other 1970's roles included guest starring in an episode of Skyways with Tony Bonner in 1979.

In 1981, she appeared in Heatwave and Winter of Our Dreams. Heatwave, directed by Phillip Noyce was based on the Juanita Nielsen disappearance case of the 1970s. Winter of Our Dreams was an award-winning drama written and directed by John Duigan.  In 1982, she was in Winner Take All – Downside Risk. This was an ABC (Australian Broadcasting Corporation) TV series about the fast-paced world of big business and co-starred Peter Curtin, Tina Bursill, Briony Behets and Diana McLean. In 1985, she was in Winners – the other facts of life with Dennis Miller, Anne Grigg, Sheila Florence and Candy Raymond. In 1991 Deane-Johns appeared in What's Cooking? an Australian cooking television series which ran from 1991 – 1999 on the Nine Network.

In 1991 Channel 9 introduced a new series called Chances, based around a family who won AUD$3 million in a lottery and the effect it had on their lives. Deane-Johns played the part of Sharon Taylor, a blonde good time girl who made a living as a hairdresser. Chances was discontinued in 1992 after a run of 127-hour-long episodes.

Deane-Johns was in the television film McLeod's Daughters in 1996 with Jack Thompson, Tammy MacIntosh and Kris McQuade. She was in the long-running Home and Away from 1997 – 2001, playing Melanie Rainbow. In 2002, she was in the Canadian-Australian Co-production of Guinevere Jones, a teenage fantasy series where she played the part of evil witch Morgana Le Fay. In 2007, she played the part of Barbara in Unfinished Sky a story about an Outback farmer who takes in an Afghani woman who has fled from a brothel.

In 2014 she had a supporting role as Fay the barmaid in the 2015 released film Last Cab to Darwin. In 2017 she played the part of Bulldozer in Throbbin' 84 which is a crime comedy set in 1984 also starring Alan King and Roslyn Gentle. The film takes its name from the 1984 Australian compilation music album Throbbin' '84.

She appeared in an episode of the Australian medical drama Harrow which was broadcast in March 2018. Deane-Johns appeared in two series of The Other Guy. in 2018 and 2019. She performed in series two of the comedy drama series ``Mr Inbetween``. in 2019.

She was in the documentary series Location Scout which was about the making of the Australian comedy film ``Top End Wedding`` which was filmed around Darwin in 2018.'She has worked with some of Australia's best-known actors. The late John Hargreaves, Judy Davis in John Duigan's Winter of Our Dreams, Nicole Kidman in the popular Kennedy Miller series Vietnam (miniseries) and the late Charles Bud Tingwell who was a regular of Australian films. She has appeared with John Meillon who is remembered from the Crocodile Dundee films as well as Heatwave. She has also worked with John Ewart who is known for Sunday Too Far Away and Alwyn Kurts who famously portrayed the gruff Inspector Colin Fox in the TV series Homicide.

Much of her work like Homicide, Cop Shop, Matlock Police, Division 4, and Bluey was done at Crawford Productions.

 Voiceovers 
As well as acting, Deane-Johns has done voiceovers including four episodes of Persons of Interest in 2014.

Theatre appearances

Deane-Johns has made many stage appearances, including:
 Meanwhile Back on Planet Earth  A musical about Liza Minnelli at the Bondi Pavilion, Sydney in 1995.Bloody Poetry. Precious Theatre Company. The Stables. Mary Shelley. 1986.The Blind Giant is Dancing  ACT Theatre Company in 1984.George and Mildred  Australian Tour with the Elizabethan Theatre Company in 1980.The Playboy of the Western World  at the Melbourne Theatre Company (MTC) in 1978.Electra (Play by Sophocles) at the Melbourne Theatre Company (MTC) in 1978.Once a Catholic  The Actors' Company Theatre, Ultimo, NSW. 1978.The Happy Apples  The Actors' Company Theatre, Ultimo, NSW. 1978Spats – Back in Business The Speakeasy, Kensington, NSW. 1976Two and Two Make Sex  with Patrick Cargill on an Australian Tour in 1975.

Writing
Deane-Johns is also a writer and has kept an anecdotal record of her thespian experiences in a series of articles called Mercia's Missives. She describes the difficulties in working with misogynistic directors, unsympathetic make-up artists, bitchy co-stars and young actors who think they are God's gift to women.

Deane-Johns wrote for the (now defunct) Australian Playboy magazine for four years in the 1980s not long before a trek across India. As she relates in her cogitations 'Mercia's Missives' "I spent a lot of time in my room, writing a column for Playboy magazine, simply entitled Women. Peter Olszewski, also known as JJ Mc Roach, the founder of the Marijuana Party was the editor at the time. He had given me the opportunity before I travelled to India. I enjoyed writing for Playboy. I had a lot of material around me at the time for inspiration. Things were fine".

Comedy
As well as singing and acting Deane-Johns has done stand-up comedy and has ambitions to appear at the Edinburgh Festival Fringe one day. She appeared with co-star and fellow Australian singer and actress Anne-Maree McDonald in Caliente in 2011. This was a one-hour stand-up comedy routine which they performed at The El Rocco Room, in Sydney's Kings Cross, New South Wales.

Posing for Australian Playboy
When pregnant with her daughter Natasha, Mercia was the first pregnant woman in the world to be photographed for Playboy.

Music
Having a diploma in music Deane-Johns has worked extensively with the recently deceased Damien Lovelock. She toured with the Celibate Rifles in 1990 on their world tour and sang in Damien's band Wigworld singing Patti Smith songs amongst others. In 1990 she performed in Damien Lovelock's promo-video for the single 'Disco Inferno' (April, 1990), taken from the 1988 album 'It's A Wig Wig World'.

She has sung in many jazz trios and duos and also cover bands for Woodstock and Led Zeppelin, Joni Mitchell and Fleetwood Mac.

New Wave

The administrations of Australian Prime Ministers John Gorton (1968–1971) and Gough Whitlam (1972–1975) put considerable extra funding in to the Australian film industry which led to the "New Wave" of the late 1970s and early 1980s. There were many productions like Picnic at Hanging Rock with Helen Morse and Anne-Louise Lambert, My Brilliant Career with Judy Davis, Wendy Hughes and Sam Neill released in August 1979, Summerfield with Nick Tate, John Waters and Elizabeth Alexander made in 1977 and The Plumber with Judy Morris and Ivor Kants directed by Peter Weir in 1979. Other famous films of that time include Gallipoli (1981) and Crocodile Dundee (1986).

Mercia Deane-Johns featured in three films of the Australian New Wave Heatwave (1981) Winter of Our Dreams (1981) and Going Down (1983).

Filmography

Award
She won an award at the 18th Melbourne Underground Film Festival in 2017 for Throbbin' 84''.

References 

Australian film actresses
Australian television actresses
Living people
Year of birth missing (living people)